Porrex II was a legendary king of the Britons as recounted in Geoffrey of Monmouth's Historia Regum Britanniae. His father was King Millus and he was succeeded by his son, Cherin.

References

2nd-century BC legendary rulers
Legendary British kings